St. Michael's Church Complex, also known as St. Michael the Archangel Roman Catholic Church, is a historic Roman Catholic church complex located at Baltimore, Maryland, United States.  The church was founded to serve the German immigrant community in Baltimore.  The church is a late 19th-century Romanesque Revival structure, 170 by 80 feet, with a steeple 180 feet high.  

The complex consists of seven main buildings: the Church, Girls’ School, Rectory, Boys’ School, Convent, Brothers’ Residence, and the Parish Hall. It was the oldest continuously operating Redemptorist Catholic church in Baltimore possessing the largest extant, completely intact Redemptorist complex remaining in the city.

St. Michael's Church Complex was listed on the National Register of Historic Places in 1989.

The church is currently a brewery called Ministry of Brewing. The former altar holds brewing vessels for beer production.

References

External links

, including photo from 1988, at Maryland Historical Trust

Butchers Hill, Baltimore
German-American culture in Baltimore
Roman Catholic churches in Baltimore
Properties of religious function on the National Register of Historic Places in Baltimore
Redemptorist churches in the United States
Churches on the National Register of Historic Places in Maryland